Umm Haratayn (also spelled Umm Hartein) could refer to the following villages in Syria:

Umm Haratayn, Hama, in the Hama Governorate
Umm Haratayn, al-Suwayda, in the al-Suwayda Governorate